Eleutherodactylus thomasi is a species of frog in the family Eleutherodactylidae endemic to Cuba. Its natural habitats are subtropical or tropical moist lowland forest, rocky areas, and caves.
It is threatened by habitat loss.

References

thomasi
Endemic fauna of Cuba
Amphibians of Cuba
Amphibians described in 1959
Taxonomy articles created by Polbot